Live at the Floating Jazz Festival may refer to:

 Live at the Floating Jazz Festival (Johnny Frigo album), 1999
 Live at the Floating Jazz Festival (Kenny Davern album), 2002